{{DISPLAYTITLE:C10H6O4}}
The molecular formula C10H6O4 may refer to:

 α-Furil, a furan compound
 Naphthazarin, a naturally occurring organic compound, one of many dihydroxynaphthoquinone structural isomers